Mass media influences spatial perception through journalistic cartography and spatial bias in news coverage.

"Journalism is one of the few industries that provide the general public the most of its information about places and geography,", mass media is one of the significant factors in shaping perception of places. Moreover, mass media has been criticized for "limited iconography that constructs the newscape-generic locations that are interchangeable from story to story, and which have come to give a restrictive and distorted worldview". Lack of geographical balance in news coverage may lead to limitations of spatial knowledge, i.e., US media focuses on a limited number of nations and regions for international news coverage.

When some news has an important geographic component, journalism concerns with a location of journalistic information. Use of maps becomes appropriate as "a map is an efficient means for showing location and describing geographic relationships". Mass media may use maps to show an event that have spatially distributed data like election results, the distribution of acid rain, radon contamination, weather forecast, traffic, or traveling routes; also describe a story of a battle, a geopolitical strategy, or an environmental threat. Geographers criticize journalistic cartography for deficiencies and constraints of map production. Maps in journalism are produced by graphic artists, who lack in cartographic training. 

Geographers have explored the spatial bias in news reporting. Spatial pattern of news is created by journalistic norms, which concern is national coverage, national interest, geographic stereotypes and accessibility to news events. As mass media provides live reporting from the scenes of the news events, journalism requires spatial proximity, event proximity, and broadcast proximity. Capitals, major financial centers and politically unstable places are highly geographically stereotyped and considered as newsworthy locations where important events happen often  Economic ties and social distance play also significant role in news coverage.

Notes

Media studies
Mass media events